Mattick is the surname of:
Bobby Mattick, an American baseball player
Fritz Mattick, a German botanist
Paul Mattick, a German-born communist
Wally Mattick, an American baseball player

See also 
 Maddock (disambiguation)
 Mattock, a hand tool